The men's 1500 metres event at the 1979 Summer Universiade was held at the Estadio Olimpico Universitario in Mexico City on 8 and 9 September 1979.

Medalists

Results

Heats

Final

References

Athletics at the 1979 Summer Universiade
1979